, occasionally referred to by his pseudonym , was a Japanese industrialist and politician. He is best known as the founder of Hankyu Railway, the Takarazuka Revue, and Toho. He served as Minister of Commerce and Industry between 1940-1941.

Life 
Ichizō Kobayashi was born in Kawarabe village, Koma, Yamanashi Prefecture (present-day Nirasaki, Yamanashi) on January 3, 1873, to a wealthy merchant family known by the trade name "Nunoya". His mother died immediately after his birth and his father left the family, leaving Kobayashi under the care of his uncle's family.

He was named Ichizō, meaning "one-three", because of his birthday, January 3. He graduated from Keio Gijuku in 1892.

After a 14-year career at the Mitsui Bank, he founded (technically as one of the promoters/executive directors) Mino-o Arima Electric Railway Company (then Hankyu Corp., now, Hankyu Hanshin Holdings, Inc.) in 1907. At Hankyu, Kobayashi made success in the management of the railway in a less-populated region by developing residential areas and an amusement park along the railway line as well as a department store at the railway terminal. He also established the Takarazuka Revue and the Hankyu professional baseball team (the predecessors of Orix Buffaloes) to attract passengers. Such a business model established by Kobayashi was followed by other railway companies in Japan.

He was appointed in charge of the Ministry of Commerce and Industry in the 1940 Konoe Cabinet.

He joined the Taisei Yokusankai Group with Shōzō Murata and Akira Kazami. They supported a new political and economic militarist-socialist program. He stood for capitalist interests in Japan's incursions into Asia and a totalitarian right-socialist government.

The purge was lifted in 1951.

Kobayashi died in January 1957. The Itsuō Art Museum in Ikeda, Osaka opened in October 1957 and is dedicated for his art collection.

Kobayashi diplomatic mission, September 1940 

Ichizō Kobayashi was commissioned by the Ministry of Foreign Affairs to lead a diplomatic mission to the Dutch East Indies in 1940. Negotiations were for a new agreement on Dutch oil. On September 12, 1940, a Japanese delegation of 24, led by Kobayashi as the Minister of Commerce and Industry, arrived in Batavia to renegotiate political and economic relations between Japan and the Dutch East Indies. Included were six high-ranking military officers, one of them Rear Admiral Tadashi Maeda.

The Dutch Embassy in Japan did not actively take part, although the Dutch Ambassador in Tokyo, J .C. Pabst, had already received the first list of Japanese economic demands in June 1940. Later, all further negotiations were conducted via the Dutch colonial administration in Batavia and Sukabumi, and received support from the Japanese Consulate General, in the persons of Matatoshi Saito (before 1941) and later by Yutaka Ishizawa.

Their first demand was an increase of petrol exports to Japan from the existing 570,000 tons in 1939 to 3,750,000 tons, about 50% of the total Dutch East Indies production. The Dutch answered that existing obligations would only permit an increase to about 1,800,000 tons.  Kobayashi initially accepted this proposal, but was soon recalled to Japan on October 2, 1940.

In the book Day of Deceit: The Truth About FDR and Pearl Harbor written by Robert Stinnett:
The heated diplomatic interchanges between Kobayashi and van Mook (H.J. van Mook, Dutch minister) were in sharp contrast to the peaceful surroundings. Japan's diplomats angrily contended that the Netherlands delegates were mere puppets of Washington. On the table were proposals involving Japanese rights to obtain oil and petroleum products from the Netherlands' enormous reserves in the Dutch East Indies. Japan called for the Dutch to provide a minimum of 3,150,000 metric tons of petroleum annually. One of the delegates, Japanese minister of commerce Ichizō Kobayashi, demanded that the Dutch guarantee a delivery schedule covering a five-year period. Kobayashi expressed the attitude of his government: The Netherlands has been closely co-operating with United Kingdom and the United States. Now is the time to shake hands with Japan. 

Another diplomatic commission was then led by Kenkichi Yoshizawa.

References

Further reading

External links 

 Itsuo Art Museum 

1873 births
1957 deaths
People from Yamanashi Prefecture
Baseball executives
Government ministers of Japan
Hankyu Railway
Japanese art collectors
Japanese railway entrepreneurs
Japanese sports businesspeople
Japanese theatre managers and producers
Keio University alumni